Harpen-Rosenberg is a statistical area of the city of Bochum in the Ruhr area in Germany. Up to the 19th century Westphalian was spoken here. Harpen-Rosenberg is a statistical area in the working-class north of Bochum. The large shopping center Ruhrpark, which includes a particularly large cinema, is in Harpen. Harpen-Rosenberg is in the east of Bochum.

Boroughs of Bochum